Renardo Sontonio Foster (born July 15, 1984) is a former American football offensive tackle. He was signed by the Atlanta Falcons as an undrafted free agent in 2007. He played college football at Louisville.

Foster has also been a member of the New Orleans Saints and Florida Tuskers.

Professional career
As a rookie in 2007, Foster played in seven games with two starts for the Atlanta Falcons. He was placed on injured reserve on October 24, 2007 due to a knee injury. He was placed on the physically-unable-to-perform list on July 25, 2008. He was waived on June 16, 2009.

Foster was claimed off waivers by the St. Louis Rams on June 19, 2009. He was waived on September 4.

Foster was added to the Saints' practice squad on September 30, 2009. He was released on October 13 and re-signed to the practice squad on October 16. He was released again on December 23.

In 2010, Foster had another stint with the Rams, this time playing in 10 games with one start.

Personal life
Foster's younger brother Ramon Foster was a guard for the Pittsburgh Steelers from 2009 to 2019.

References

External links
Louisville Cardinals bio

1984 births
Living people
People from Ripley, Tennessee
Players of American football from Tennessee
American football offensive tackles
American football offensive guards
Louisville Cardinals football players
Atlanta Falcons players
St. Louis Rams players
New Orleans Saints players
Florida Tuskers players